Michel Butel (19 September 1940 – 26 July 2018) was a French journalist and novelist. He won the Prix Médicis for L'Autre amour in 1977. He was the founding editor of L'Autre Journal, a political and literary magazine, from 1984 to 1993. He was also the founding editor of L'Impossible from 2011 to 2013.

References

1940 births
2018 deaths
People from Tarbes
20th-century French journalists
French male journalists
20th-century French novelists
French male novelists
French magazine editors
Prix Médicis winners